Somaya Bousaid (born 5 May 1980) is a Tunisian Paralympian athlete competing mainly in category T13 middle-distance events.

She competed in the 2004 Summer Paralympics in Athens, Greece where she won the gold medal in the T12 1500m and  a bronze medal in the T12 800m.  She returned to the Paralympics in 2008 in Beijing, China winning the more bronze medals in the T13 1500m and the T12/13 800m.

Somaya competed in the 2012 Summer Paralympics in London, UK where she won a silver medal in the T13 400m.

References

External links
 

1980 births
Paralympic athletes of Tunisia
Paralympic gold medalists for Tunisia
Living people
Athletes (track and field) at the 2008 Summer Paralympics
Athletes (track and field) at the 2012 Summer Paralympics
Athletes (track and field) at the 2016 Summer Paralympics
Paralympic silver medalists for Tunisia
Medalists at the 2008 Summer Paralympics
Medalists at the 2012 Summer Paralympics
Medalists at the 2016 Summer Paralympics
Tunisian female middle-distance runners
Paralympic medalists in athletics (track and field)
20th-century Tunisian women
21st-century Tunisian women